Mazeh Sarvemam Qoli (also Romanized as Māzeh Sarvemām Qolī) is a village in Ahmadfedaleh Rural District, Sardasht District, Dezful County, Khuzestan Province, Iran. At the 2006 census, its population was 118, in 20 families.

References 

Populated places in Dezful County